Craspedotis is a genus of moths in the family Gelechiidae.

Species
 Craspedotis diasticha Turner, 1919
 Craspedotis pragmatica Meyrick, 1904
 Craspedotis soloeca Meyrick, 1904
 Craspedotis thinodes Meyrick, 1904

References

Gelechiinae
Taxa named by Edward Meyrick
Moth genera